Wrocławski Klub Sportowy Śląsk Wrocław Spółka Akcyjna, commonly known as WKS Śląsk Wrocław, Śląsk Wrocław or simply Śląsk, is a Polish football club based in Wrocław that plays in Ekstraklasa, the highest level of the Polish football league system. The club was founded in 1947 and has competed under many names since then; adopting the name Śląsk Wrocław ten years after their foundation. In 1977, Śląsk Wrocław won the Polish league championship for the first time. The club has also won the Polish Cup twice, the Polish Super Cup twice and the Ekstraklasa Cup once. The club's home is Stadion Wrocław, a 45,105 capacity stadium in Wrocław which was one of the host venues during UEFA Euro 2012. Club previously played at Olympic Stadium and Stadion Oporowska.

History
The club has had many names since its foundation in 1947. They are listed below;
 1947 – Pionier Wrocław
 1949 – Legia Wrocław
 1950 – Centralny Wojskowy Klub Sportowy Wrocław
 1951 – Okręgowy Wojskowy Klub Sportowy Wrocław
 1957 – Wojskowy Klub Sportowy Śląsk Wrocław
 1997 – Wrocławski Klub Sportowy Śląsk Wrocław Sportowa Spółka Akcyjna
 Wrocławski Klub Sportowy Śląsk Wrocław Spółka Akcyjna

Śląsk is the Polish name of Silesia, the historical region in which Wrocław is located.

Honours

Ekstraklasa
Champions (2): 1976–77, 2011–12
Runners-up (3): 1977–78, 1981–82, 2010–11
Polish Cup
Winners (2): 1975–76, 1986–87
Runners-up: 2012–13
Ekstraklasa Cup
Winners: 2009
Polish Super Cup
Winners (2): 1987, 2012

Youth Teams:
Polish U-19 Champion
Champions: 1978–79
Runners-up: 1976–77
Bronze Medal: 1977–78, 1979–80, 2017–18

The fans

Śląsk fans are one of the largest supporter movements in Poland. In the early 1970s, they were one of the pioneers of football supporters groups. Their fan base is right-wing. Due to the clubs historical fight against the former communist government it is still not unusual to see Anti-semitic and nationalistic slogans on the stands. The Śląsk supporters call themselves Nobles from Wrocław.

Friendships

They have a friendship with Lechia Gdańsk with which the two clubs fans have had a friendship since 1977, and have had friendly relations since 1967. This is the oldest fan friendship in Polish football. During the 2017–18 season, the two sets of fans celebrated their 40th Friendship Anniversary. Games between the two are often called "the friendship match".

The fans have also had a friendship with Motor Lublin dating back to the 1990s. Due to the clubs' long friendship, Śląsk were invited to play a friendly in 2015 in Lublin to celebrate Motor's 65th anniversary.

Despite the clubs' close proximity, Śląsk also hold friendly relations with Miedź Legnica. The fans also have friendships with fans from both SFC Opava, from the Czech Republic, and Ferencvárosi TC, from Hungary.

Rivals
Their biggest rivals are Zagłębie Lubin, with the games between the two known as the "Lower Silesian Derby" (Polish: Derby Dolnego Śląska). The two teams are the largest in the Lower Silesia region, with Śląsk representing Wrocław (the largest city in the area) and Zagłębie representing Lubin. Both teams have won the Ekstraklasa twice, Śląsk in 1977 & 2012, and Zagłębie in 1991 & 2007.

The fans of Lechia and Śląsk formally had a friendship with the Wisła Kraków fans, creating the "Three Kings of Great Cities" coalition. Wisła fans left the coalition in 2016. Since 2016 Wisła Kraków itself has since turned into a rivalry.

Arka Gdynia, Lech Poznań and Cracovia are rivals dating back to the time with their alliance with Wisła. This was due to the two largest fan coalitions in Poland, "Three Kings of Great Cities" (Śląsk, Lechia, Wisła) and "The Great Triad" (Lech, Arka, Cracovia) with any of the opposite coalition teams playing each other resulting in a big and hotly contested match.

There is also a competitive rivalry with Widzew Lodz, with the two often facing each other throughout their history.

Stadium

The Stadion Wrocław in Wrocław, Poland, is the highest fourth category football (soccer) stadium built for the 2012 UEFA European Football Championship. The Stadium is located on aleja Śląska in the western part of the city (Pilczyce district). It is the home stadium of the Śląsk Wrocław football team playing in the Polish PKO Ekstraklasa. The stadium has a capacity of 45,105 spectators, all seated and all covered. The Municipal Stadium in Wroclaw is the largest arena in Ekstraklasa and the third largest in the country (after National Stadium and Silesia Stadium). Stadium construction began in April 2009 and was completed in September 2011. Stadium opening took place at 10 September 2011 with boxing fight between Tomasz Adamek and Vitali Klitschko for WBC heavyweight title. First football match between Śląsk Wrocław and Lechia Gdańsk was played on 10 October 2011. Śląsk won this match 1–0 and Johan Voskamp was first goalscorer on the new stadium.

Śląsk Wrocław in European football

Śląsk Wrocław's score is shown first in each case

Notes
 1Q: First qualifying round
 2Q: Second qualifying round
 3Q: Third qualifying round
 PO: Play-off round
 1R: First round
 2R: Second round
 3R: Third round
 QF: Quarter-finals

Current squad

Other players under contract

Out on loan

Notable players
Had international caps for their respective countries.

 Poland
  Henryk Apostel (1971–72)
  Łukasz Broź (2018-)
  Adrian Budka (2005–06)
  Eugeniusz Cebrat (1978–79)
  Piotr Celeban (2008–12), (2014–21)
  Mateusz Cetnarski (2011–14)
  Piotr Ćwielong (2010–13)
  Jan Erlich (1973–78)
  Roman Faber (1973–84)
  Janusz Gancarczyk (2007–10)
  Zygmunt Garłowski (1973–81)
  Wojciech Golla (2018–20)
  Janusz Góra (1985–92)
  Jarosław Góra (1993–97)
  Roman Jakóbczak (1966–69)
  Tomasz Jodłowiec (2012)
  Paweł Kaczorowski (2007)
  Zygmunt Kalinowski (1971–79)
  Przemysław Kaźmierczak (2010–14)
  Jacek Kiełb (2015–16)
  Adam Kokoszka (2013–14), (2015–18)
  Jakub Kosecki (2017–18)
  Zdzisław Kostrzewa (1979–84)
  Marcin Kowalczyk (2012–13)
  Rafał Lasocki (2007)
  Rafał Leszczyński (2022–)

  Antoni Łukasiewicz (2008–11)
  Krzysztof Mączyński (2019–)
  Łukasz Madej (2009–12), (2016–17)
  Adam Marciniak (2008)
  Adam Matysek (1989–93)
  Sebastian Mila (2008–14)
  Mariusz Pawelec (2008–)
  Mariusz Pawełek (2014–17)
  Tadeusz Pawłowski (1974–82)
  Mirosław Pękala (1977–84)
  Arkadiusz Piech (2017–19)
  Dariusz Pietrasiak (2011–12)
  Leszek Pisz (2001)
  Przemysław Płacheta (2019–20)
  Waldemar Prusik (1981–89)
  Kazimierz Przybyś (1983–84)
  Andrzej Rudy (1983–88)
  Dariusz Rzeźniczek (1990)
  Hubert Skowronek (1962–67)
  Jakub Słowik (2017–19)
  Waldemar Sobota (2010–13), (2020–22)
  Joachim Stachuła (1963–66)
  Janusz Sybis (1969–83)
  Grzegorz Szamotulski (2001)
   Stefan Szefer (1963–65)
  Roman Szewczyk (1989)
  Tadeusz Świcarz (1951)

  Ryszard Tarasiewicz (1979–89)
  Jan Tomaszewski (1967–70)
  Marcin Wasilewski (2000–02)
  Maciej Wilusz (2021)
  Piotr Włodarczyk (2000–01)
  Roman Wójcicki (1980–82)
  Władysław Żmuda (1974–80)

Bosnia and Herzegovina 
  Amir Spahić (2009–13)

 Czech Republic
  Vladimír Čáp (2007–09)
  Lukáš Droppa (2014–15)
  Marcel Gecov (2015–16)
  Petr Schwarz (2021–)
 Gabon
  Éric Mouloungui (2013)
 Georgia
  Lasha Dvali (2016–17)
 Hungary
  Márk Tamás (2020–22)
 Iceland
  Daníel Leó Grétarsson (2022–)
 Japan
  Ryota Morioka (2016–17)
 Latvia 
  Igors Tarasovs (2017–19)
 Macedonia
  Ostoja Stjepanović (2016–17)
 Montenegro
  Filip Raičević (2020) 
 Slovakia
  Peter Grajciar (2015–17)
  Ľuboš Kamenár (2016–17)
 Slovenia
  Boban Jović (2017–18)
  Dalibor Stevanović (2012–14)
 Zambia
  Lubambo Musonda (2019–21)
 Zimbabwe
  Ronald Sibanda (1997–98)

Managers

 Karel Finek (1958)
 Vilém Lugr (1959)
 Artur Woźniak (1969–70)
 Władysław Żmuda (1971–77)
 Orest Lenczyk (1979–81)
 Henryk Apostel (10 Oct 1984 – 30 June 1988)
 Alojzy Łysko (1988)
 Tadeusz Pawłowski (6 Oct 1992 – 10 May 1993)
 Stanisław Świerk (1993–95)
 Wiesław Wojno (1 July 1996 – 11 March 1997)
 Jerzy Kasalik (11 March 1997 – 21 September 1997)
 Grzegorz Kowalski (1 July 1998 – 20 December 1998)
 Wojciech Łazarek (21 Dec 1998 – 3 November 1999)
 Władysław Łach (3 July 2000 – 10 April 2001)
 Janusz Wójcik (10 April 2001 – 7 June 2001)
 Marian Putyra (7 June 2001 – 24 August 2001)
 Petr Nemec (24 Aug 2001 – 25 March 2002)
 Marian Putyra (25 March 2002 – 30 June 2003)
 Grzegorz Kowalski (1 July 2003 – 30 September 2004)
 Ryszard Tarasiewicz (29 September 2004 – 28 June 2006)
 Luboš Kubík (6 July 2006 – 2 October 2006)
 Jan Żurek (2 Oct 2006 – 18 June 2007)
 Ryszard Tarasiewicz (19 June 2007 – 22 September 2010)
 Paweł Barylski (interim) (22 September 2010 – 27 September 2010)
 Orest Lenczyk (27 September 2010 – 31 August 2012)
 Paweł Barylski (interim) (31 Aug 2012 – 3 September 2012)
 Stanislav Levy (3 September 2012 – 23 February 2014)
 Tadeusz Pawłowski (24 Feb 2014 – 6 December 2015)
 Romuald Szukiełowicz (7 Dec 2015 – 9 March 2016)
 Mariusz Rumak (9 March 2016 – 19 December 2016)
 Jan Urban (5 Jan 2017 – 19 February 2018)
 Tadeusz Pawłowski (19 Feb 2018 – 11 December 2018)
 Paweł Barylski (interim) (11 Dec 2018 – ?)
 Vítězslav Lavička (2019 – 21 March 2021)
 Jacek Magiera (22 Mar 2021 – 8 March 2022)
 Piotr Tworek (9 Mar 2022 – 1 Jun 2022)
 Ivan Đurđević (2 Jun 2022 – current)

Śląsk Wrocław (women)

The Śląsk Wrocław (women) team was formed in 2020 taking the place of KŚ AZS Wrocław in the Ekstraliga.

See also
 List of Polish football champions
 Śląsk Wrocław II (reserve team)
 Śląsk Wrocław (basketball)
 Śląsk Wrocław (handball)
 Wrocław football riot 2003

Footnotes

References

External links

Śląsk Net 
Wrocław Kibice Sport 
ŚLĄSKopedia 
About WKS Śląsk Wrocław

 
 
Football clubs in Wrocław
Military association football clubs in Poland
Association football clubs established in 1947
1947 establishments in Poland